Admiral Johnston may refer to:

Charles H. Johnston (born 1948), U.S. Navy rear admiral
Clarence Johnston (1903–1996), British Royal Navy admiral
Clive Johnstone (born 1963), British Royal Navy vice admiral
David Johnston (admiral) (born 1962), Royal Australian Navy vice admiral
Means Johnston Jr. (1916–1989), U.S. Navy admiral
Rufus Zenas Johnston (1874–1959), U.S. Navy rear admiral

See also
Tony Johnstone-Burt (born 1958), British Royal Navy vice admiral